The BMW X1 is a line of subcompact luxury crossovers produced by BMW. Debuted in 2009, the first-generation X1 was based on the E90 3 Series and offered rear-wheel drive layout as standard. At its introduction, it was positioned as the smallest SUV in BMW line-up, below the X3, aiming a wider range of customers due to its smaller size, increased efficiency, and a lower price tag due to the all-wheel drive layout (xDrive) being optional.

The second-generation X1 marked the switch to a front-wheel drive-based layout using the UKL2 platform shared with the BMW 2 Series Active Tourer and the Mini Countryman. Despite its name, it is now only the second smallest SUV produced by BMW since the introduction of the X2.



First generation (E84; 2009) 

The E84 X1 is the first-generation model and was originally presented as the BMW Concept X1 at the Paris Motor Show in 2008. Development of the vehicle started in 2006 when BMW identified the need for a smaller and more efficient model in its SUV line-up as petrol prices were increasing. Due to the urgent need to produce the vehicle, development and pre-production time was shortened by 40 percent compared to previous X Series models.

It is based on the same platform as the E90 3 Series and features the same  wheelbase. The X1 is the first BMW X Series to be available in the sDrive trim (two-wheel drive). It was not introduced to the United States until 2012.

In 2013, the E84 X1 underwent a facelift, featuring restyled exterior and interior design elements, as well as the integration of BMW EfficientDynamics on all models. The original X1 sold 820,529 units.

Second generation (F48; 2016) 

The F48 X1 is the second-generation model. It is built upon the front-wheel drive based UKL2 platform, and is available in long-wheelbase and long-wheelbase hybrid variants in China. The range consists of turbocharged 3-cylinder and 4-cylinder petrol and diesel engine options. Base models are front-wheel drive (branded as sDrive), with all-wheel drive (xDrive) available as an option and is standard for some higher-end models.

Third generation (U11; 2022) 

The U11 X1 was released in June 2022. Available powertrains include a turbocharged 3-cylinder, 4-cylinder petrol, inline-three diesel, inline-four diesel mild hybrid, petrol plug-in hybrid, and an electric variant called the iX1.  

Base models are front-wheel drive (branded as sDrive), with all-wheel drive (xDrive) available as an option (standard for some higher-end models). Like the BMW iX3, the all-electric iX1 will not be available in the United States nor Canada.

The redesigned X1 has an updated interior similar to that of the iX, i4, and 2023 3 Series. It features a 10.25 inch digital gauge cluster as well as a 10.7 inch center screen running BMW's iDrive 8 infotainment system. 

According to BMW, this X1 is 1.7 inches longer, 0.9 inches wider, and 1.7 inches taller than the previous generation, with a wheelbase that is 0.9 inches longer. While the frontal area increased, the drag coefficient was lowered to 0.27.

An M Sport package is available that adds adaptive suspension (available for the first time on the X1), a lower ride height, and interior and exterior styling elements.

Production and sales 

The following are the production and sales figures for BMW X1 models:

References

External links 

 Official site

X1
Cars introduced in 2009
2010s cars
2020s cars
Mini sport utility vehicles
Luxury crossover sport utility vehicles
All-wheel-drive vehicles
Rear-wheel-drive vehicles
Front-wheel-drive vehicles
Production electric cars